Whitespotted filefish is a common name for several fishes and may refer to:

Cantherhines dumerilii, native to the Indian and Pacific Oceans
Cantherhines macrocerus, native to the Atlantic Ocean